The 1896 eastern North America heat wave was a 10-day heat wave in New York City, Boston, Newark and Chicago that killed about 1,500 people in August 1896.

History
There were ten days of temperatures at least  with high humidity and little breeze. It killed more than the New York City draft riots and the Great Chicago Fire combined. A majority of the deaths were of working-class men in their twenties who performed manual labor.

The New York City Public Works Commissioner ordered that his workers' shifts be modified so they would not be working during midday, and he had fire hydrants opened to cool people on the street. Theodore Roosevelt, then New York City Police Commissioner, distributed free ice from local police stations. After accidental deaths from people falling off the roofs they were sleeping on, the New York City Parks Department allowed people to sleep in parks overnight.

References

External links

Heat waves in the United States
1890s in New York (state)
1890s in Chicago
Eastern North America Heat Wave, 1896
1896 heat waves
1896 natural disasters in the United States
1896 in North America
1896 in New York (state)
August 1896 events